Hamdhoon Farooq (born 7 April 1988) is a Maldivian film actor and dancer.

Early life and career
Farooq was born on 7 April 1988 in Male'. His parents, Ali Farooq and Mariyam Haleem are actors working in the film industry since 1997. He is the brother of actor and director Ravee Farooq and comedy actor and dancer Hamdhan Farooq.

In 2008, he appeared along with Ravee Farooq and Niuma Mohamed in Ravee's short film Erey by playing the role of a thug who get trapped at a construction site. He then starred alongside Mohamed Manik, Ahmed Asim and Ibrahim Jihad in Ali Shifau's horror suspense thriller short film Ummeedh as one of the four friends who get lost at sea. In 2014, Farooq collaborated with Ahmed Nimal for his drama film Aniyaa, alongside Niuma Mohamed, Ismail Rasheed and Mohamed Jumayyil. Due to some technical difficulties while screening the film, it failed to garner enough hype and did average business with mixed reviews critics.

2018 was a dull year for Maldivian film industry with regard to 2018 Maldivian presidential election, though he had two releases, where his first film was the suspense thriller film Dhevansoora written and directed by Yoosuf Shafeeu. The film marks Shafeeu's thirtieth direction and features an ensemble cast of twenty-one actors. Revolving around a murder investigating, the film received positive reviews from critics and was considered a "norm-breaker" for the Maldivian cinema. He then starred in the first Maldivian web-series, a romantic drama by Fathimath Nahula, Huvaa where he played a brief role as a police officer.

Filmography

Feature film

Television

Short film

References 

Living people
People from Malé
21st-century Maldivian actors
Maldivian film actors
1988 births